Craig R. Penrose (born July 25, 1953) is a former professional American football quarterback. He spent five seasons in the National Football League (NFL) with the Denver Broncos (1976–1979) and the New York Jets (1980) and 2 seasons with the United States Football League (USFL)'s Denver Gold. His family origin is Cornish American.

He played in a pass-happy system at San Diego State University in an era where such passing was common.

1974: 132/235 for 1,683 yards with 10 TD vs 9 INT.
1975: 198/349 for 2,660 yards with 15 TD vs 24 INT.

See also
 List of college football yearly passing leaders

References

External links
New York Jets bio
NY Jets All-Time Roster

1953 births
Living people
People from Woodland, California
American football quarterbacks
Colorado Buffaloes football players
San Diego State Aztecs football players
Sportspeople from Greater Sacramento
Denver Broncos players
New York Jets players
Denver Gold players
All-American college football players
Players of American football from California